The 2005 FIFA U-17 World Championship, the eleventh edition of the tournament, was held in the cities of Lima, Trujillo, Chiclayo, Piura and Iquitos in Peru between 16 September and 2 October 2005. Players born after 1 January 1988 could participate in this tournament. Mexico beat favorite Brazil by 3–0 in the final, making it the first U-17 Championship for Mexico.

Venues

Teams 

 USA is the only team to have qualified for all 11 tournaments so far, followed by Brazil and Australia who have each qualified 10 times. While Netherlands, Turkey, Peru, Gambia and Korea DPR are new to the competition.

Squads 
For a list of the squads see 2005 FIFA U-17 World Championship squads

Group stage

Group A

Group B

Group C

Group D

Knockout stages

Quarterfinals

Semifinals

Playoff for 3rd place

Final

Winner

Awards

Goalscorers 
Carlos Vela of Mexico won the Golden Shoe award for scoring five goals.

Final ranking

References

External links 
 FIFA U-17 World Championship Peru 2005, FIFA.com
 FIFA Technical Report

FIFA U-17 World Championship
FIFA
International association football competitions hosted by Peru
FIFA U-17 World Cup tournaments
September 2005 sports events in South America
October 2005 sports events in South America